Jónas Sen (born 1962) is an Icelandic pianist, music critic for Fréttablaðið, composer and TV host.

He was the keyboard player in Björk’s band, which was on a world tour in 2007 and 2008. In 2011 Björk and Jónas arranged all the Biophilia songs for keyboard instruments, which were released on the iPad and iPhone versions of Biophilia.

Jónas has hosted several TV programs for RÚV, The Icelandic National Broadcasting Service, about music in Iceland. These include 12 programs about Icelandic instrumentalists (Tíu fingur), broadcast in 2006, eight programs about Icelandic singers (Átta raddir), which were broadcast in 2011 and Tónspor, broadcast in 2012. His TV program about Gunnar Kvaran, a well known cellist in Iceland, was aired in December 2012.

Discography

Jónas Sen
1993 - Works by Brahms, Liszt and Scriabin.

Versations Tetralogia
2005 - Collaboration with Gabríela Friðriksdóttir, Björk, Borgar Magnason and Daníel Ágúst Haraldsson.

Langt fyrir utan ystu skóga
2011 - New arrangements of songs by Björk, performed with Icelandic singer Ásgerður Júníusdóttir. The album also features songs by Magnús Blöndal Jóhannsson and Gunnar Reynir Sveinsson.

References

External links
Official Site

Living people
Jónas Sen
1962 births
21st-century pianists